Praseodymium oxide may refer to:

 Praseodymium(III) oxide (dipraseodymium trioxide), Pr2O3
 Praseodymium(IV) oxide (praseodymium dioxide), PrO2
 Praseodymium(III,IV) oxide, Pr6O11